Tarbuck and All That! was a British television series aired in 1975. It was produced by Associated Television and starred Jimmy Tarbuck. All five episodes are believed to have been destroyed.

References

External links
Tarbuck and All That! on IMDb

1975 British television series debuts
1975 British television series endings
Lost television shows
English-language television shows
1970s British television series